The 1972 Winston 500 was a NASCAR Winston Cup Series race on May 7, 1972, at Alabama International Motor Speedway in Talladega, Alabama. This was the first start for three-time Cup Series Champion Darrell Waltrip.

Background
Talladega Superspeedway, originally known as Alabama International Motor Superspeedway (AIMS), is a motorsports complex located north of Talladega, Alabama. It is located on the former Anniston Air Force Base in the small city of Lincoln. The track is a Tri-oval and was constructed by International Speedway Corporation, a business controlled by the France Family, in the 1960s. Talladega is most known for its steep banking and the unique location of the start/finish line - located just past the exit to pit road. The track currently hosts the NASCAR series such as the Monster Energy Cup Series, Xfinity Series, and the Camping World Truck Series.

Race report
The grand marshal for the event was Auburn football head coach, Ralph "Shug" Jordan.

There were fifty drivers on the grid. It took three hours and forty-five minutes for 188 laps of racing. There were nine cautions for 62 laps with 53 lead changes. David Pearson defeated Bobby Isaac by almost five seconds.

Bobby Isaac would win the pole position at  during qualifying. There were many mechanical failures in the race including the rear end failures and an incident involving a windshield. Marty Robbins, who was also a country music star, dropped out of the race after 179 laps; after his top speed proved to be substantially faster than that he achieved in qualifying and being in position to pass the leaders, he confessed to altering his restrictor plate and was disqualified and listed as finishing in last place, declining Rookie of the Race honors. Other notable drivers  were: Richard Petty, LeeRoy Yarbrough, Elmo Langley, Coo Coo Marlin, and Neil Castles. Darrell Waltrip would make his NASCAR debut in this race and finish in 38th after starting 25th. Clarence Lovell would also make his introduction to NASCAR during this race.

Had Bobby Allison not had this one bad finish here at Talladega, he would've had 20 top-10 finishes in a row. The only thing is, his cars had engine problems in the long races. All three engine failures occurred at the 500-mile races of Rockingham, Talladega, and Dover. Even when his engines were being strained at the long races, he still did well, getting top-5 finishes at most of the 500+ mile races that season. 

Notable crew chiefs for this race were Jake Elder, Steven Gray, Harry Hyde, Dale Inman, Tom Vandiver and Herb Nab. Inman, Hyde, and Wood would help maintain the vehicles for the winner, the runner-up, and the fifth-place finisher of this race.

James Hylton would lose his points lead to Richard Petty after this race. The winner of the race would receive $23,745 in total winnings ($ when adjusted for inflation) while the last-place finisher won $745 for a disqualification ($ when adjusted for inflation).

Qualifying

Top 20 finishers

References

Winston 500
Winston 500
Winston 500
NASCAR races at Talladega Superspeedway